Euphorbia kuriensis is a species of plant in the family Euphorbiaceae. It is endemic to Yemen.  Its natural habitat is subtropical or tropical dry shrubland.

References

kuriensis
Endemic flora of Socotra
Vulnerable flora of Asia
Taxonomy articles created by Polbot